Halu Kaleh (also Romanized as Halū Kaleh; also known as Bālā Halū Kaleh and Halū Kalleh-ye Bālā) is a village in Do Hezar Rural District, Khorramabad District, Tonekabon County, Mazandaran Province, Iran. At the 2006 census, its population was 69, in 27 families.

References 

Populated places in Tonekabon County